The Ground Assault Badge of the Luftwaffe was a World War II German military decoration awarded to Luftwaffe personnel for achievement in ground combat. It was instituted on 31 March 1942 by the commander-in-chief Hermann Göring.

The badge, designed by the graphic and textile artist Sigmund von Weech (1888-1982), features an oak leaf wreath with at its apex a Luftwaffe eagle, grasping a swastika, flying above a storm cloud, from which a centered positioned lightning bolt strikes trough ground. The general criteria for its presentation was the participation in three separate combat operations on separate days.
Luftwaffe soldiers who had already been awarded combat recognition badges of the Heer (German Army), such as the General Assault Badge or the Infantry Assault Badge, were required to exchange their badges for the Ground Assault Badge of the Luftwaffe.

As the war progressed it became necessary to further distinguish those soldiers who had already exceeded the awarding criteria. To accomplish this distinction, Göring instituted four numbered grades on 10 November 1944 based on the number of combat operations. The new badge was changed at its base to incorporate the operations number marking each new grade.
 2nd grade (II. Stufe) for 25 eligible operations
 3rd grade (III. Stufe) for 50 eligible operations
 4th grade (IV. Stufe) for 75 eligible operations
 5th grade (V. Stufe) for 100 eligible operations

Versions

Notes

References

 Doehle, Heinrich (2000). Die Auszeichnungen des Grossdeutschen Reichs. Orden, Ehrenzeichen, Abzeichen.  (in German). Norderstedt, Germany: Patzwall. 
 Klietmann, Kurt-Gerhard (1981). Auszeichnungen des Deutschen Reiches. 1936–1945. (in German). Stuttgart, Germany: Motorbuch 

Awards established in 1942
Military awards and decorations of Nazi Germany
1942 establishments in Germany
Luftwaffe